Coleophora cornutella is a moth of the family Coleophoridae. It is found from Fennoscandia to the Pyrenees and the Alps and from France to Romania.

The larvae feed on Betula pubescens. They create a bivalved lobe case. The front end is very broad and the rear end strongly narrowed and curved downwards. Larvae can be found from September to May.

References

cornutella
Moths described in 1861
Moths of Europe